Exo Planet #3 – The Exo'rdium (stylized as EXO PLANET #3 – The EXO'rDIUM) was the third tour of South Korean-Chinese boy band Exo. The tour was officially announced on June 15, 2016 and began in Seoul's Olympic Gymnastics Arena on July 22, 2016. The first 6 dates were in South Korea, making Exo the first K-pop group to have the longest solo concert series in Seoul. During Exo's EXO'rDIUM tour, member Kai struggled with an ankle injury, making him unable to fully participate in the first three months of the tour. In February 2017, official announcements were made to announce that the promotions would continue in Mexico and the United States, marking the EXO'rDIUm tour as Exo's second World Tour. It was announced on March 30, 2017 that the tour will conclude in Seoul with two encore performances on May 27 and 28, titled "Exo Planet #3 – The Exo'rdium[dot]".

Concerts

Seoul

 The announcement of the tour was made officially by SM Entertainment in June 2016, with six dates in Seoul in the enclosure Olympic Park Gymnastics Stadium better known as Olympic Gymnastics Arena and Olympic Gymnastics Hall.
 The EXO'rDIUM was originally announced to kick off on July 23, 2016 with five concerts but due to popular demand, a sixth show was scheduled later for July 22, 2016.
 With the third tour kicking off, Exo moved away from their previous outfits and debuted new clothes that allow their skin to breathe more easily and feature see-through shirts and shirts with very deep necklines. Exo's third tour also included the release of a second version of their official light stick. The new light stick was released in July 2016 and includes Exo's sleek logo in white with a multi-color changing light. Exo also released new merchandise, including framed and transparent portraits. Fans can reportedly hold the frames up to the sky to see a natural gradient in each photo.
 July 23, 2016 - Kai suffered a re-injury of his ankle during Exo's EXO Planet #3 - The EXO'rDIUM tour. The leader of Exo, Suho, made the announcement to fans on July 24, 2016 during their concert. Kai came on stage later to explain to fans that although he didn't break any bones, he did severely strain the ligaments in his ankle. Following Exo's first three concerts in Seoul, it was announced that Kai would continue taking time off to rest and would not be able to perform during some concert songs.
 July 24, 2016 - Fans became concerned for member Lay after Exo's performance of "Lightsaber". Lay was reportedly seen appearing extremely exhausted and grabbing at his sides in pain before promptly limping off of the stage.
 According to Chung Joo-won from Yonhap News, "The three-hour concert set out with a special movie clip, in which the Exo members are portrayed as supernatural demi-gods who represent different elements of nature, such as fire, water, earth and woods. The fans screamed frantically as their favorite members showed up on the screen, standing high on the Egyptian Sphinx, rescuing an innocent girl in Vietnam War and protecting a little boy from hurricane."
 Exo's six day stunt in Seoul not only brought out 84,000 screaming fans and parents of the Exo members, but a long list of celebrities including: Bada, Lee Joon Gi, SHINee's Minho, Lee Ho Jung, Ryu Jun Yeol, Red Velvet, ZE:A's Kwanghee, Seo Hyun Jin, Goo Hye Sun, Park Min Ha, Lee Soo Man, Baek Sung Hyun, Nam Gyu Ri, Kang Tae Hwan, Bruce Youn,  Kim Hyosun, Kwon Si Hyun, and reportedly Kim Ki Bang, Yeon Jun Seok, Lee Sung Kyung, and Yoo Seung Ho. Kim Hee Chan, Ji Soo, Park So Hyun, Girls' Generation's Hyoyeon, Apink's Kim Nam Joo, and Sehun's brother are also rumored to have attended.
 On March 30, 2017, Exo's official Vyrl account announced the conclusion of the Exo Planet #3 – The Exo'rdium tour with two encore performances in Seoul. The encore performance was held on May 27 and 28 as "Exo Planet #3 – The Exo'rdium[dot]".

China
 The EXO'rDIUM was originally scheduled to take place in Hangzhou, Chengdu, and Nanjing. Upon South Korea's announcement that they were going to deploy the United States' THAAD system, China responded by placing heavy restrictions on South Korean artists. Due to this current conflict, all EXO'rDIUM concerts scheduled in China (excluding Hangzhou) have been canceled.
 Tickets for the EXO'rDIUM in Hangzhou sold out in five minutes.
 September 30, 2016 marked the almost full return of member Kai after his previous foot injury. Kai participated in most of the performances for Exo's concert in Hangzhou.

Bangkok

Exo's EXO'rDIUM tour in Bangkok sold 24,000 tickets in three minutes, setting a new record.
 Despite arm injuries, Chanyeol and Sehun fully participated in the EXO'rDIUM in Bangkok. Although Kai was present, his physical performance was still limited due to his ongoing recovery from an ankle injury sustained back in July.
 During the September 11th performance, Exo was joined on stage by Yoo Jae Suk for a special performance of 'Dancing King'. This collaboration was part of Jae Suk's mission that he needed to complete from Infinite Challenge.

Japan
Exo's concert in Fukuoka (Day 1) also saw an almost full return of member Kai after his previous foot injury. Kai participated in all of Exo's performances except for the performance of 'Overdose'.
 During the Fukuoka (Day 1) performance, Chanyeol sang a cover of Masayoshi Yamazaki's 'One More Time, One More Chance'.
 Exo added their new single 'Coming Over' to the set list for their performances in Tokyo and Osaka.

Philippines
Member Lay halted his activities with Exo starting from the concerts held at the Smart Araneta Coliseum (Day 1 and 2).

Mexico
On February 1, 2017, an official announcement was made by tour promoter, Dilemma, to announce that Exo would be expanding their Asia Tour to Mexico, thus making the EXO'rDIUM Exo's second World Tour.

The Exo's concert held in Mexico had place in the Arena México, one of the biggest places for shows and concerts. Exo sold approx. 12,784 / 14,198 (90%)  tickets in 30 minutes. 
The show was held on April 27, 2017

United States
On February 2, 2017, an official announcement was made by tour promoter, My Music Taste, to announce that the EXO'rDIUM tour would be coming to Newark and Los Angeles.

Set list

Tour dates

Personnel
 Tour organizer 
 SM Entertainment

 Artists

 EXO-K (Suho, Baekhyun, Chanyeol, D.O., Kai, Sehun)

 EXO-M (Lay, Xiumin, Chen)

Note: Lay made his last public appearance with the group in the Hong Kong concerts due to overlapping schedules with his personal alignments.

 Tour promoter 

 Dream Maker Entertainment (KR)
 SM True (TH)
 Star Planet (MY)
 Malaysia Major Events (MY)

 PULP Live World (PH)
 ONE Production (SG)
 Dilemma (MX)
 MyMusicTaste (US)

 Ticketing partners 

 YES24 (KR)
 All Ticket (TH)
 Damai (CH)
 Ticketnet (PH)

 TicketCharge (MY)
 Sports Hub Tix (SG)
 Superboletos (MX)
 TicketMaster (US)

References

External links
  

2016 concert tours
2017 concert tours
Exo concert tours
K-pop concerts